William Churchill (1627–1702), of Colliton House, Dorchester and Muston Manor, Piddlehinton, Dorset, was an English politician.

He married Grace Meller, the daughter of MP, John Meller.

He was a Member (MP) of the Parliament of England for Dorchester in 1685.

References

1627 births
1702 deaths
English MPs 1685–1687
Members of the Parliament of England for Dorchester